Eufalconius pendleburyi is a groundhopper found in Malaysia, belonging to the tribe Scelimenini.  It is the only species in the monotypic genus Eufalconius.

See also
Phaesticus azemii
Discotettix adenanii
Discotettix selangori
Scelimena hafizaii
Scelimena razalii

References

Insects of Malaysia
Orthoptera of Asia
Tetrigidae